Soft Border Patrol is a Northern Irish mockumentary sitcom in the style of a reality television programme based around the subject of the Republic of Ireland–United Kingdom border in a post-Brexit world. It shadows the Soft Border Patrol, a fictional border agency backed by governments in London, Dublin and Belfast, and the European Commission in Brussels. The title is a play on the desire at the time of writing for the outcome of the Brexit negotiations for there to be a soft border between the Republic of Ireland and Northern Ireland.  Much of the series was unscripted, with broad ideas given to the cast by the writers.

It was written by the Glasgow-based The Comedy Unit and the first episode was broadcast on BBC One Northern Ireland on 2 March 2018 at 22:35, with episodes two and three following on the 9 and 16 March.

Cast
 Karen Hassan as Lisa McCoy
 Alan Irwin as Sandy Donaldson
 Neil Delamere as Niall Sweeney
 Diona Doherty as Tracy Jones
 Patrick Buchanan as Connor Lafferty
 Chris Patrick-Simpson as Kris Davis
 Michael Condron as Ben McGregor
 Julie Maxwell as Charlene Dunn
 Faolan Morgan as Derek O'Hara
 Eline Van der Velden as Marianne Van Kesteren
 David Ireland as Farmer Campbell
 Michael Stranney as Craig Carson
 Elaine Malcolmson as Penny
 Keith Singleton as Michael Flynn
 Lucy McConnell as Heather Campbell
 Christian Talbot as Norman Norman
 Shane Todd as Laurence Lyle

Writers
 The Ulster Fry
 Joe Hullait 
 Stephen G Large
 Ciaran Bartlett
 PJ Hart
 Susannah McKenna
 Marc McElroy
 Matthew McDevitt
 Bryce Hart
 Leesa Harker
 Eoin Cleland
 Ryan Early

Additional material by the cast

Episodes

Series 1 (2018)

Series 2 (2019)

Series 3 (2020)

See also
Scot Squad

References

External links
 
 

2018 British television series debuts
2010s British satirical television series
2010s British sitcoms
Alternate history television series
BBC satirical television shows
BBC television sitcoms
British mockumentary television series
English-language television shows
Television series by Banijay
Television shows set in Northern Ireland